28 is a 2019 Indian Malayalam language experimental thriller feature film directed by Jayan Naduvathazhath streaming on MX Player and Spuul. The film grabbed attention as the entire feature film was shot in 5 days with budget of less than Rs. 3 lakhs. The film bagged 2 awards in the WinterSunTV Viewers Choice Awards for Best actor in a Lead Role and for the Best Actor in Negative Role. The film also Won 'Honourable Mention ' award at 7th ART INTERNATIONAL INDEPENDENT FILM FESTIVAL.

Plot
The movie 28 revolves around an overnight meeting between five friends. One of them has come to payback a long-standing debt. The friend settles his debts and leaves for abroad. Later a policeman friend comes in and finds out that the currency was fake. This triggers a rift between all of them. Each one takes stands and argues their point differently. Twists and turns follow (like the game of 28) and towards the end of the movie the mysterious sides of the characters unfold.

Cast
 Vinodh Mohanan 
 Jackson AJ 
 Anjith Merrie Jan 
 Sarat Prakash 
 Praveen Sukumaran 
 Amitha Anil

Awards and nominations
Won 'Honourable Mention ' award at 7th ART INTERNATIONAL INDEPENDENT FILM FESTIVAL.

References

External links

2019 films
2010s Malayalam-language films